Tuensang (Pron:/ˌtjuːənˈsæŋ/) is a town located in the north-eastern part of the Indian state of Nagaland. It is the headquarters of the Tuensang District and has a population of 36,774. The town was founded in 1947 for the purpose of administrating the erstwhile North Eastern Frontier Agency (NEFA) that comprised the present day Districts of Tuensang, Mon, Longleng, Kiphire, Noklak and Shamator. Today, these six districts combined are also known as 'Eastern Nagaland'.

History
The Tuensang area was originally made up of all the present six districts of Eastern Nagaland. Even after the British conquest of India, the Tuensang tribal region remained unadministered due to lack of sufficient men and money. However, in 1902, the area was brought under the nominal control of the British. It was called Tribal Area and was administered by the Governor General of India. In 1948, a separate division called Tuensang Administrative Circle was created.

When the Constitution of India was first released in 1950, Tuensang Division was placed in "Part B" category of tribal districts as per the Sixth Schedule. It became part  of the North-East Frontier Agency (NEFA). Subsequently, in 1957, it was merged with the Naga Hills District to form a new administrative unit under the Ministry of External Affairs. After negotiation with the secessionists, this administrative unit was later made a full-fledged state called Nagaland.

Geography
It has an average elevation of 1371 metres (4498 feet).

Demographics
 India census, Tuensang had a population of 36,774, up 24% from 29,654 in 2001. Males constitute 56% of the population and females 44%. Tuensang has an average literacy rate of 71%, higher than the national average of 59.5%: male literacy is 74%, and female literacy is 67%. In Tuensang,13% of the population is under 6 years of age.

Tuensang is one of the larger towns in Nagaland along with Chümoukedima, Dimapur, Kohima and Mokokchung. The landowners/permanent tribes of the town are mainly the Changs, Sangtams, Yimkhiungs and Khiamniungans. The town serves as a nerve center for the eastern part of Nagaland.

Tuensang is the headquarters to apex organisations such as Eastern Nagaland Peoples' Organisation (ENPO), Eastern Naga Students' Federation (ENSF), Khiamniungan Tribal Council (KTC), Chang Khulei Setshang (CKS), Confederation of Chang Students' Union (CCSU), Chang Baptist Lashong Thangyen (CBLT), Eleutheros Christian Society (ECS), Eastern Farming Association, etc.

Education

Schools
 Government Higher Secondary School
 St. John's High School
 Christ King School
 St. Joseph's School
 Thangjem High School
 Chaba School
 St. Xavier School
 St. Anthony School
 Holy Angel School
 Little Flower School
 Akum Imlong School
 Loyem Memorial High School
 Baptist Thangyen School:Tuensang
 Montessori Kids Care School
 Assam Rifles School
 National Institute of Open Schooling
 Holy Cross School Saksi
 Eklavya Model Residential School Saksi
 3rd Battalion N.A.P School Saksi
 Jawahar Navodaya Vidyalaya Chare
 Government High School Noksen
 Government Higher Secondary School Noklak
 Christian High school Shamator
 Government High School Shamator
 Tulip Residential Academy, 3rd NAP
 Trinity Academy, Tuensang
 Government High School pathso
 Baptist School pathso
 G.M.S Pathso Nokeng
 GHS Chingmei 
 GMS Chingmei
 National Institute of Open Schooling

Colleges
 Sao Chang College
 Loyem Memorial College
 District Institute of Teachers' Education
 Imlong Theological College Saksi
 Oriental Theological College Yangli
 IGNOU Study Center

Public utilities
Tuensang has a functional 100-bed Civil Hospital which has been upgraded to Regional Diagnostic Center (RDC) but is yet to be operationalised. It has an Agriculture Science Center known as KVK, an undertaking of the Government of India, Badminton Stadium, Town Hall and a Public Ground. The "Longpang Project," a program managed by Eleutheros Christian Society (ECS) in collaboration with government and private agencies, near Hakchang Village, has one health center which runs the only rehabilitation center in the district that takes care of AIDS patients and drug addicts.

Transportation
The National Highways 155 passes through the district, linking Mokokchung (NH-61 junction) and Jessami (NH-150 junction) via Tuensang Town, covering a distance of 342 km. Recently the ongoing work on NH-155 came under severe criticisms from the public led by Eastern Naga Students' Federation for alleged poor workmanship, non-adherence to contract norms by the contractors, and lackadaisical attitude of the Nagaland Public Works Department.

References

External links
 Official government site

 
Cities and towns in Tuensang district